John Richard Reid  (3 June 192814 October 2020) was a New Zealand cricketer who captained New Zealand in 34 Test matches. He was New Zealand's eighth Test captain and the first to achieve victory, both at home, against the West Indies in 1956, and away, against South Africa in 1962.

Early life 
Reid was born in Auckland in 1928 to Iris and Norman Reid. His father, Norman, was a Scottish-born rugby league player, while his mother, Iris, was a music teacher. The family moved to Wellington when Reid was young. He studied at the Hutt Valley High School, where he started out as a rugby union player but later switched to cricket, stemming from heart problems and bouts of rheumatic fever.

Playing career
Reid started out as a strong and aggressive bowler who, in his early days, was an authentic quick. He later turned to off-cutters and spin from a short run-up with a trademark side-step. Until a swollen knee slowed down his movements and checked his agility, he was a strong and multi-talented fieldsman at slip and in the covers. On the 1949 tour of England he was the reserve wicketkeeper, keeping wicket in several matches including the final Test. "The figures mislead", said John Mehaffey, whose favourite Reid was. "Nobody who saw him at the crease would dispute his own assessment that he could have increased his batting average by half again if he had played in the 1980s side with Richard Hadlee and Martin Crowe." Reid was one of the Wisden Cricketers of the Year for 1959.

Reid never featured in an England-beating New Zealand Test side, but his men secured a narrow first-innings lead against Dexter's eleven in the Third Test in Christchurch in 1963. Unable to take advantage, they collapsed at the hands of Fred Trueman and Fred Titmus for 159 in their second innings, of which Reid hit exactly 100 before stumbling from the field in pallid enervation. The second-highest score was 22. This remains the lowest all-out Test match total to include a century.

Post playing-career 
Post retirement, in 1969, Reid played in what is thought to be the first cricket match at the South Pole, with the striped barber's-type pole with a silver reflecting glass ball on top representing the actual Pole acting as the wicket. The match ended when Reid hit a six and the ball was unable to be found in the snow of the outfield. It has been noted that every shot he played, no matter where he hit it, travelled north.

He served New Zealand Cricket as a national selector from 1975 to 1978. In 1981, he moved to South Africa to be a coach. He had earlier noted that the sporting boycott of South Africa during its apartheid era was 'ill-conceived'.

He served as an International Cricket Council (ICC) match referee from 1993 through 2002, serving 50 Tests and 98 One Day International matches. As a match referee he was known for his tough actions. He had suspended Pakistan fast bowler, Waqar Younis, and had fined Azhar Mahmood for ball tampering. He had also acted on complaints on fast bowler Shoaib Akhtar's bowling action.

In 2003, he was appointed as the president of New Zealand Cricket. On the death of Trevor Barber on 7 August 2015, Reid became the oldest surviving New Zealand Test cricketer.

Reid was also involved in popularising squash in New Zealand. He set up the John Reid Squash centre in Wellington, which was subsequently sold off to the New Zealand Squash Rackets Association.

Personal life 
Reid married Norli Le Fevre in 1951; he had met her earlier at age 18 while she was working as a nurse at the hospital where he was being treated for rheumatic fever. The couple had one son, Richard, and two daughters, Alison and Ann. Richard played nine one-day internationals for New Zealand.

Reid died in Auckland on 14 October 2020, aged 92.

Honours
In the 1962 Queen's Birthday Honours, Reid was appointed an Officer of the Order of the British Empire, for services to sport, especially cricket. He was made a Companion of the New Zealand Order of Merit, also for services to cricket, in the 2014 New Year Honours.

Publications
Reid wrote two books, Sword of Willow (1962) and A Million Miles of Cricket (1966). Joseph Romanos wrote the biography John Reid: A Cricketing Life in 2000. John Reid is a 55-minute DVD made by the Vid Pro Quo company in 2003 of interviews with Reid by Grahame Thorne and footage of matches he played in.

References

External links

 Martin-Jenkins, C. (1983) The Cricketer Book of Cricket Disasters and Bizarre Records, Century Publishing: London. .
 
 

1928 births
2020 deaths
New Zealand people of Scottish descent
New Zealand Test cricket captains
New Zealand Test cricketers
Otago cricketers
Wellington cricketers
Commonwealth XI cricketers
International Cavaliers cricketers
Cricket match referees
People educated at Hutt Valley High School
New Zealand Officers of the Order of the British Empire
Companions of the New Zealand Order of Merit
Wisden Cricketers of the Year
New Zealand cricketers
South Island cricketers
North Island cricketers